Chang Chen Ghost Stories may refer to:
 Chang Chen Ghost Stories (2015 film), a Chinese suspense thriller film
 Chang Chen Ghost Stories (2016 film), a Chinese romance horror thriller film